Buchi Babu may refer to:

 Buchi Babu (film), a 1980 Indian film
 Butchi Babu (Sivaraju Venkata Subbarao; 1916-1967), Indian writer
 M. Buchi Babu Naidu, Indian cricketer